Pathankot Assembly constituency Assembly constituency is a Punjab Legislative Assembly constituency in Pathankot district, Punjab state, India. It is a segment of Gurdaspur (Lok Sabha constituency).

Members of Legislative Assembly

Election results

2022

2017

2012

2007

References

External links
  

Assembly constituencies of Punjab, India
Pathankot district